Longitarsus velai is a species of beetle in the subfamily Galerucinae that is endemic to Spain.

References

V
Beetles described in 1997
Endemic fauna of Spain
Beetles of Europe